Simanggang is a state constituency in Sarawak, Malaysia, that has been represented in the Sarawak State Legislative Assembly from 1969 to 1979, from 1991 to present.

The state constituency was created in the 1968 redistribution and is mandated to return a single member to the Sarawak State Legislative Assembly under the first past the post voting system.

History
It was abolished in 1979 after it was redistributed. It was re-created in 1987.

2006–2016: The constituency contains the polling districts of Sabu, Simanggang, Lamanak Seberang, Munggu Sabun, Sengat, Undup, Bayai.

2016–present: The constituency contains the polling districts of Sabu, Simanggang, Lamanak Seberang, Munggu Sabun, Sengat, Undup, Bayai.

Representation history

Election results

References

Sarawak state constituencies